MV Juno was a passenger and vehicle ferry operated by Caledonian MacBrayne on the Firth of Clyde, Scotland between 1974 and 2007. She was the middle of three vessels nicknamed "streakers", the first in the Calmac fleet to be fitted with Voith Schneider Propellers . Juno left service in early 2007 and was laid up at Rosneath for 4 years. On 18 May 2011, she was beached there for scrapping and was gone by the end of July.

History
MV Juno took to the water at Lamont's in Port Glasgow, on 16 September 1974 and was christened by Mrs W M Little, wife of the Managing Director of the Scottish Transport Group, Calmac's owning company at the time. This allowed the skipper a clearer view when berthing. Juno and Jupiter were remarkably manoeuvrable, being the first in the Calmac fleet to be fitted with Voith Schneider Propellers, which allowed the ships to literally turn within their own length. This was revolutionary in large vessels as they could berth and depart far quicker than many of the smaller vessels at the time.

Juno spent much of her first decade on the Gourock-Dunoon run, replacing the much smaller . In 1981, the then Secretary of State for Scotland offered the rival firm on the  Hunter's Quay-Mclnroy's Point route, Western Ferries, a grant to buy an additional vessel to provide a frequent, high speed passenger-only service from Gourock to Dunoon. At this point, Calmac considered the termination of their route. This was disallowed, preventing an outrage among the residents of Dunoon and Gourock. This meant that Calmac needed a vessel to offer a passenger-only service on the route, but financially this was not an option. Instead, Calmac resumed service with Juno, but with only one sailing per hour. This allowed popularity to grow with Western Ferries, which would otherwise have been vulnerable to being put out of business by the frequent Calmac service.

From 1986, the "streakers",  and Juno provided three rosters on the Upper Clyde: one each at Dunoon and Rothesay and the third (1A Roster) to Kilcreggan with peak sailings to Dunoon and Rothesay. Initially they interchanged roster each month, but this became weekly in 1996. From 1993, a cruise ran to Tighnabruaich twice a week, after the commuter runs. These were popular and the programme was extended to include Loch Long, the Kyles of Bute, with Tarbert, Loch Fyne on Sundays. The cruises were withdrawn in 2001, leaving two of the "streakers" serving Rothesay, and the other, Dunoon.

Final years

In July 2005, Juno was joined on the Rothesay to Wemyss Bay route by the new . By early 2007, work was required at Rothesay and vessels had to be very cautious during berthing. The service was operated by Juno and Saturn, with their superior manoeuvrability compared with Bute. On 21 April 2007, Juno was displaced by Bute. The following day, she crossed to Rosneath pier on the Gare Loch and was never to sail for Caledonian MacBrayne again.

Juno remained laid up at Rosneath, where her condition slowly deteriorated. Functioning parts were used to keep  and  operational. Juno was withdrawn first because her certification did not allow her to operate beyond Arran. In October 2010, she was joined by Jupiter, although Jupiter was kept in reserve, able to return to service if needed. This arrangement continued until the future of the Gourock to Dunoon service was known.

In February 2011, it was announced that Juno was to be scrapped. She moved under her own power onto the mud at Rosneath on 18 May 2011 where her scrapping commenced. By July 2011, she was gone, with her bell and lions preserved at the McLean Museum in Greenock.

Layout
Juno had a large open car deck towards the stern and two internal passenger decks, as well as an open deck, built up on the front of the vessel. This allowed foot passengers to remain separate from the car deck which was level with the lower passenger deck. The upper passenger deck consisted of a small coffee cabin and games machines, with stairs leading down to the lower deck. The lower deck lounge had a ticket office (which closed following new regulations in 2005) and toilets aft, with doorways leading to the car deck. Juno had her accommodation renovated in 1993. The following year, her lifeboats were replaced by smaller life rafts to allow for more deck space.

References

Caledonian MacBrayne
1974 ships
Ships built on the River Clyde